Päivi Jaana Maarit Alafrantti (born 8 May 1964 in Tervola, Lapland) is a retired female javelin thrower from Finland.

Achievements

1No mark in the final

External links
 
 
 http://www.tilastopaja.org/db/fi/atw.php?ID=10489

1964 births
Living people
People from Tervola
Finnish female javelin throwers
Athletes (track and field) at the 1988 Summer Olympics
Athletes (track and field) at the 1992 Summer Olympics
Olympic athletes of Finland
European Athletics Championships medalists
Universiade bronze medalists for Finland
Universiade medalists in athletics (track and field)
Medalists at the 1989 Summer Universiade
Sportspeople from Lapland (Finland)